RVH may refer to:

 Right ventricular hypertrophy
 Royal Victoria Regional Health Centre
 Royal Victoria Hospital (disambiguation)